Zalnando (born 25 December 1996) is an Indonesian professional footballer who plays as a left-back for Liga 1 club Persib Bandung.

Club career

Sriwijaya
Zalnando was born in Cimahi. He was included in the squad of Sriwijaya for 2016 Indonesia Soccer Championship A. Zalnando make his debut against Persiba Balikpapan in the second week ISC A.

Persib Bandung
In 2019, Zalnando signed a contract with Indonesian Liga 1 club Persib Bandung. He made his league debut on 28 October 2019 in a match against Persija Jakarta at the Kapten I Wayan Dipta Stadium, Gianyar. He finished the season with 7 appearances.

On 26 February 2021, Zalnando extended his contract for another two years with Persib. He played the full 90 minutes in the won to PSS Sleman on 22 October 2021, where he registered one assist. Eight days later, Zalnando give another assists a goal by Wander Luiz in Persib's 3–0 win over Persipura Jayapura.

On 22 February 2022, Zalnando scored his first league goal for the club in a 0–2 win against PSM Makassar and scored second league goal in a 3–2 win against Madura United on 13 March 2022. Zalnando had his best performance in the 2021–22 season where he scored 2 goals and 21 league appearances.

Zalnando started the new 2022–23 season with Persib in a 2–2 draw over Bhayangkara on 24 July 2022, and give one assists a goal by Rachmat Irianto in 42nd minute.

On 14 December 2022, Zalnando suffered a serious injury while competing against Dewa United in the continued match of Liga 1. He broke his ankle due to the wrong footing during a tackle on Dewa United's player, Karim Rossi when the match entered the 80th minute, he had to undergo intensive and also be absent for the next few matches.

International career
Zalnando made his first appearance in the national team while playing for Indonesia U-16 in U-16 2011 AFF U-16 Youth Championship And Zalnando following the selection of national team U23 for 2015 Sea Games. And he was selected in the squad 

He made his international debut for Indonesia senior team on 21 March 2017, against Myanmar, where he coming as a substitute.

Career statistics

Club

International

Honours

Club 
Sriwijaya U-21
 Indonesia Super League U-21: 2012–13

Sriwijaya
 East Kalimantan Governor Cup: 2018

References

External links 
 
 

1995 births
Living people
Sundanese people
Indonesian footballers
People from Cimahi
Sportspeople from West Java
Sriwijaya F.C. players
Persib Bandung players
Liga 1 (Indonesia) players
Indonesia youth international footballers
Indonesia international footballers
Association football defenders